A lowboy is a type of dressing table or vanity with one or two rows of drawers.

Lowboy, low-boy, or low boy may also refer to:
 Lowboy (trailer), a semi-trailer with two drops in deck height
 Lowboy, a 2008 novel by American writer John Wray
 Low-boy, a type of hi-hat arrangement (two cymbals and a foot pedal)
 Low Boy, a 1953 Studebaker Champion
 Lowboy, a Featherbed motorcycle frame